Hamed Kavianpour (born December 1, 1978) is an Iranian retired professional football player.

Club career
He has played most of his career for Persepolis FC where he had several good seasons, playing in the midfield with his great skill and dribbling. His critics however claim his dribbling delays the speed of the game.

During 2001 and 2002 some English clubs showed interest in him and he had trials with clubs such as Bolton Wanderers, Ipswich Town F.C., Newcastle United F.C., and Reading F.C., but Persepolis preferred that he sign a one-year contract with UAE club Al Wasl in July 2002.

In May 2006 he signed a two-year contract to play for Turkish club Kayserispor in Süper Lig.

On September 22, 2006 the Turkish club announced that they will release the Iranian midfielder as he was allegedly tested positive for doping after the match against Erciyesspor.

The Turkish Football Federation banned Kavianpour from playing in Turkey for 2 years, however Kavianpour planned to appeal to the Turkish Football Federation in order to reduce the ban. The ban was later reduced to 1 year.

He was backed in Tehran, Iran, played for Steel Azin from 2007 to 2010 amongst a series of big signings of the club such as Ali Karimi and Ferydoon Zandi. In an interview with Iranian TV Channel 3, he mentioned that he plans to play for a division 1 club in 2012.

Club career statistics

 Assist Goals

International career
He made his debut for the Iranian national team in March 2000 against Cyprus. He was one of Iran's main players in 2002 World Cup qualifying campaign, which ended with a dramatic 2-1 aggregate defeat against the Republic of Ireland. Until 2004 he was a regular starter for the team and earned 50 caps.

Notes

External links
 Official site
 Hamed Kavianpour at TeamMelli.com

1978 births
Living people
People from Nur, Iran
Iranian footballers
Iran international footballers
Association football midfielders
Persepolis F.C. players
Al-Wasl F.C. players
Kayserispor footballers
Iranian expatriate sportspeople in Turkey
Expatriate footballers in Turkey
Steel Azin F.C. players
Süper Lig players
Iranian expatriate footballers
2000 AFC Asian Cup players
2004 AFC Asian Cup players
UAE Pro League players
Expatriate footballers in the United Arab Emirates
Sportspeople from Gilan province